Long Ride Home (1988) is a novel by W. Michael Gear.

1988 American novels
Western (genre) novels